The Pacific Asia Conference on Information Systems (PACIS) is an annual conference for Information Systems and Information Technology academics and professionals and is affiliated with the Association for Information Systems. Its purpose is to provide a high quality forum for researchers, practitioners, and policy makers to exchange research findings and ideas on the adoption of leading information-related technologies and practices.

PACIS is considered the premier information systems event in the Asia Pacific region and provides a platform for panel discussions and the presentation of peer-reviewed information systems research papers.

The conference attracts several hundred submissions each year, and those that are selected for presentation appear in the 'PACIS Proceedings’, which are archived online at https://web.archive.org/web/20061212041256/http://www.pacis-net.org/.

The first PACIS conference took place in 1993 at National Sun Yat-Sen University in Kaohsiung, Taiwan. The 1993 and 1995 conferences carried the title of Pan Pacific Conference on Information Systems. In 1997 the name was changed to the Pacific Asia Conference on Information Systems. From 1993 it was a biannual event until 2000. Since 2000, PACIS has been held annually in different cities throughout the Asia Pacific, generally within East Asia and Australasia. The conference has attracts an increasing number of registered delegates from around 150-200 in early years to around 400-600 in recent years. More than 250 papers were presented either as full papers or poster papers in recent conferences.

The PACIS logo consists of a globe positioned on a map of the Asia Pacific.

PACIS Venues

See also
Information Systems
Management Information Systems

External links
PACIS E-Library of Proceedings
Association for Information Systems

Information systems conferences
Academic conferences
Association for Information Systems conferences